The Terrorist is a 1995 South Korean film directed by Kim Young-bin, starring Choi Min-soo as the younger brother of a police officer who becomes involved with gangsters. It became a box office hit and earned Choi Min-soo an award for best actor.

Plot
Two brothers, Sa-hyun and Soo-hyun, have a close relationship. Soo-hyun is a policeman who fights for justice and Soo-hyun dreams of following in his brother's footsteps. Despite Soo-hyun's intentions, he became a gangster by accident. The tragic film deals with social issues such as family relationships and organized crime.

Cast
Choi Min-soo ... Oh Soo-hyun
Lee Geung-young ... Oh Sa-hyun
Yum Jung-ah ... Hwang Chae-eun
Heo Joon-ho ... Sang-chul
Dokgo Young-jae ... Im Tae-ho
Park Bong-seo ... Jeong Byung-jin
Yun Mun-sik ... Detective Moon
Lee Ki-young ... Choon-woo
Yoo Oh-sung ... Jeom-pyo
Myung Gye-nam ... Detective Chief

External links
 
 

1995 films
South Korean crime drama films
South Korean crime action films
1990s crime action films
1990s crime drama films
Films about organized crime in South Korea
1995 drama films